The Wik peoples are an Indigenous Australian group of people from an extensive zone on western Cape York Peninsula in northern Queensland, speaking several different languages. They are from the coastal flood plains bounding the Gulf of Carpentaria lying between Pormpuraaw (Edward River) and Weipa, and inland the forested country drained by the Archer, Kendall and Holroyd rivers. The first ethnographic study of the Wik people was undertaken by the Queensland born anthropologist Ursula McConnel. Her fieldwork focused on groups gathered into the Archer River Mission at what is now known as Aurukun.

Location
The Wik peoples inhabited the western coastal area of the Cape York Peninsula between the Winduwinda to the north and the Taior to the south, with the Wik-Mungkan on the eastern flank.

McConnel's overall mapping was succinctly summarized by Sir James Frazer as follows:

[They] occupy a stretch of country along the Gulf of Carpentaria, thirty to fifty miles wide through which flow the Watson, Archer, Kendall, Holroyd and Edward Rivers. The territory of thed Wik-Munkan begins below the junction of the Coen and Archer and the Pretender and Holroyd, and extends to the mouth of the Archer and the junction of the Kendall and Holroyd. It touches the Watson River in the north and the Edward in the south, and covers and area, roughly speaking, of three thousand square miles. The Wik-Munkan do not come in contact with the sea, for a strip of land along the coast varying in parts from two to ten miles wide is inhabited by kindred coastal tribes. Of these the Wik-Natera or Wik-Kalkan occupy the coast for sixty or seventy miles south of the Archer River, concentrating chiefly on two inland arms of the sea called Yoinka and Arimanka; the Wiki-Natanya or bush-rat people inhabit the corner of the coast between Arimanka and the Kendall - a distance of ten miles, and the Wik-Nantjara occupy the coastal country between the Kendall-Holroyd and the Edward.
McConnel's classification (1930) outlined the following groups
 The largest group, the Wik-Mungkan, were an inland tribe, neighbouring the Kokiala and Kaantju to the north and northeast, the Ayapathu to the east and southeast, and the Koko Taiyari south of the Edward river.
 The Wiknantjara, on the coast from the Edward river to the Kendall river, according to McConnel. Alternative name Ngandjara.
 The Wiknatanja (bush-rat people), a coastal people further north, allocated  by Tindale at the mouths of the Kendall river.
 The Wikmean were further north and inland from Cape Keerweer.
 The Wikepa also are thought to have had domains extending over  near Cape Keerweer.
 The Wik-kalkan lived on the coastal area, with an estimated  of territory.
 The Wikapatja had  around and on the mangrove islands of the Archer River delta.
 The Wikampama were on the Watson River, whose few remnants had mostly been detribalized by 1930 and lived at the Aurukun Mission Station.

All of these tribes were covered by Norman Tindale in his 1974 classification. Writing in 1997, Neva Collings stated that the group then comprised the peoples of Wik-Ompom, Wik-Paacha, Wik-Thinta, Wik-Ngathara, Wik-Epa, Wik-Me'anha, Wik-Ngathara, Wik-Nganychara, and Wik-Iiyanh.

History
Under early colonization and settlement in northern Queensland it was widely thought that the indigenous peoples were "less than worthless, vermin which should be exterminated", and, according to Neva Collings, the Wik were regarded in these terms.

Native title
The Wik Peoples won a landmark court case, which resulted in the formal recognition of their native title rights.
The High Court of Australia later found that native title could coexist with a pastoral lease.

See also

 Wik Peoples v Queensland
 Koowarta v Bjelke-Petersen
 Wik languages
 Wild Rivers in Australia

Notes

Citations

Sources

 
Aboriginal peoples of Queensland
Far North Queensland